Antaeotricha isomeris is a moth of the family Depressariidae. It is found in Brazil (Minas Gerais).

The wingspan is about 19 mm. The forewings are shining white with the dorsal half brownish irregularly sprinkled with dark fuscous, with a median dorsal spot of dark fuscous suffusion, the discal stigmata forming dark fuscous dots on the upper edge of the dividing line. There are some dark fuscous dots around the apex and termen. The hindwings are pale whitish-ochreous.

References

Moths described in 1912
isomeris
Moths of South America
Taxa named by Edward Meyrick